Pamphilius histrio is a species of leaf-rolling sawflies within the Symphyta belonging to the family Pamphiliidae.

Distribution
This species is present in most of Europe (Austria, Belgium, United Kingdom, Central European Russia, Czech Republic, Denmark, Estonia, Finland, France, Germany, Hungary, Italy, Latvia, Norway, Slovakia, Spain, Switzerland and Netherlands).

Description
Head and thorax are black with yellowish markings. Legs are yellow and wings are transparent.

Biology
Larvae feed on Populus tremula.

References

External links
 Galerie-insecte

Sawflies
Insects described in 1811